Carsonville may refer to a location in the United States:

Carsonville, Georgia, an unincorporated community in northern Taylor County, Georgia
Carsonville, Michigan
Carsonville Township, Minnesota
Carsonville, Missouri, an unincorporated place in St. Louis County, Missouri
Carsonville, Pennsylvania, an unincorporated community in Jefferson Township, Dauphin County, Pennsylvania
Carsonville, Virginia, an unincorporated community in Grayson County, Virginia